CJOI-FM is a French-language Canadian radio station located in Rimouski, Quebec.

Owned and operated by Bell Media, it broadcasts on 102.9 MHz with an effective radiated power of 33,600 watts (class B) using an omnidirectional antenna.

The station has an adult contemporary format and is a member of the "Rouge FM" (formerly RockDétente) network since June 2005, when a deal was made to transfer ownership of some stations between Corus and Astral. Originally a Corus station, CJOI is now owned by Astral Media.

Originally known as CFLP when it opened in 1978 as an AM station on 1000 kHz (and identified itself as "Radio Mille"), the station moved to the FM band in late 2000, due to serious problems in nighttime coverage resulting from a very directional signal necessary to protect WMVP in Chicago, Illinois. The station switched its call sign when it moved to FM and changed its format from talk to adult contemporary (and abandoned its Radiomédia affiliation).

On August 18, 2011, at 4:00 p.m. EDT, all "RockDétente" stations, including CJOI, rebranded as Rouge FM. The last song under "RockDétente" was "Pour que tu m'aimes encore" by Celine Dion, followed by a tribute of the branding. The first song under "Rouge" was "I Gotta Feeling" by Black Eyed Peas.

References

External links
102,9 Rouge
 

Joi
Joi
Joi
Joi
Radio stations established in 1978
1978 establishments in Quebec